Pararondania is a genus of flies in the family Tachinidae.

Species
Pararondania multipunctata Villeneuve, 1916

Distribution
South Africa.

References

Diptera of Africa
Exoristinae
Monotypic Brachycera genera
Tachinidae genera
Taxa named by Joseph Villeneuve de Janti